Abiatha, Hathes, and Mamlacha were virgins and martyrs of the Beth-Garma province of Syria. The word "Belth" in Chaldaic means "hill", this city was built on a hill in Assyria. They were martyred under Shapur II, about 345 AD. Their feast day is November 20. They are included in the Heiligen-Lexicon by J. E. Stadler. Mamlacha is also a Hebrew word which means "Kingdom".

References

Sources
Holweck, F. G. A Biographical Dictionary of the Saints. St. Louis, MO: B. Herder Book Co. 1924.
 
 

Year of birth missing
345 deaths
Saints trios
Persian saints
Syrian Christian saints
4th-century Christian martyrs
People executed by the Sasanian Empire
Christians in the Sasanian Empire